A Woman & a Man is the sixth studio album by American singer Belinda Carlisle, released in the United Kingdom on September 23, 1996, by Chrysalis Records (then part of the EMI Group, like Carlisle's former label Virgin Records). The album contains songs written by Rick Nowels, Maria Vidal, Ellen Shipley, Charlotte Caffey, Neil Finn and Roxette co-founder Per Gessle who also produced one of the tracks.

It was released in the United States in 1997 (see 1997 in music) on the Ark 21 Records label. There was special DTS (surround sound) version released with a slightly different track listing compared to the original; it was only ten tracks long and did not include "Listen to Love", "Love Doesn't Live Here" and "Always Breaking My Heart" but instead had covers of the songs "Jealous Guy" by John Lennon and "The Ballad of Lucy Jordan" by Shel Silverstein.

Reception

Critical reception

The album received mixed reviews. Allmusic's Stephen Thomas Erlewine rated the album four stars out of five saying it is a "mature collection of adult pop, with cool keyboards and subtle arrangements that often make the record sound like background music". However, he also noted that "Carlisle has rarely been in better voice". Entertainment Weekly'''s Steven Mirkin gave the album C− saying that "Carlisle has neither the voice nor personality to overcome her album's cold, emotionally sterile core."

Commercial reception
The album entered the UK Albums Chart at No. 12. It outsold Carlisle's previous album, Real'', and was certified Gold by BPI for sales in excess of 100,000 copies. The album revived Carlisle's career in the singles chart – producing three top twenty hits (two of them top ten). It was released in the US but failed to chart on the Billboard 200 album chart with a total sales of 17,000 copies.

The album charted on the Australian ARIA Albums Chart on November 11, 1996, at No. 31 with only one single released to radio at the time. It only spent ten weeks in the top one hundred making the album her last charting album on the charts. It was Carlisle's last album to chart in Austria, peaking at No. 36 and stayed in the charts for two weeks. It was Carlisle's lowest charting album in Sweden, peaking at No. 44 and only spending one week in the charts. In Italy, the album peaked at No. 35.

The singles had some success in various countries. "In Too Deep" was the first song released from the album and became a top ten hit in the UK and a top twenty in Australia. "Always Breaking My Heart", written and produced by Per Gessle of Roxette, was the second song released from the album; it also reached the top ten in the UK. "Love in the Key of C", the third song released, became Carlisle's tenth top twenty UK hit. The fourth single, "California", was Carlisle's final UK Top 40 hit.

Track listing

American DTS (Surround Sound) version 
(The regular American version had the same track listing
as the UK version)

Personnel
 Belinda Carlisle – lead vocals, backing vocals (6, 9)
 Rory Kaplan – keyboards (1-5, 7-11), piano (4, 8), drum programming (10)
 Red Young – Hammond organ (5)
 Clarence Öfwerman – keyboards (6), programming (6)
 Phil Grande – guitar (1, 2)
 Davey Johnstone – mandolin (1)
 Louis Metoyer – guitar (3, 5, 9), acoustic guitar (4), electric guitar (4)
 Chrissie Schefts – guitar (5, 10), electric sitar (10)
 Per Gessle – electric guitar (6), backing vocals (6)
 Jonas Isacsson – acoustic guitar (6), electric guitar (6)
 Steve Farris – acoustic guitar (7, 8, 11), electric guitar (7, 8)
 Nick Beggs – bass guitar (1–5, 7, 8, 10), Chapman stick (4, 9, 11)
 Andres Herlin – bass guitar (6), programming (6)
 Steve Wren – drums (1-5, 7-11)
 Paulinho da Costa – percussion (1-5, 8-10)
 Caroline Dale – string arrangements (3, 10)
 Andy Brown – conductor (3, 10)
 David Sabee – string coordinator (3, 10)
 [Northwest Sinfonia] – strings (3, 10)
 Ellen Shipley – backing vocals (1, 3, 4, 5, 7-10)
 Maria Vidal – backing vocals (1, 3, 4, 5, 7-11)
 Brian Wilson – backing vocals (2)
 Susanna Hoffs – backing vocals (11)

Production
 Producers – David Tickle (Tracks 1-5 & 7-11); Per Gessle and Clarence Öfwerman (Track 6).
 Executive producer – J. F. Cecillon
 Recorded and mixed by David Tickle
 Assistant engineers – Brian Lapin and Randy Wine
 Design – Stylorouge
 Inside photography – Lorenzo Agius and Ellen Von Unwerth
 Front cover photo – Ellen Von Unwerth
 Management – Miles Copeland III and Simon Watson

Charts

Certifications and sales

Release history

References

1996 albums
Belinda Carlisle albums
Chrysalis Records albums
Ark 21 Records albums
EMI Music Japan albums
Albums produced by David Tickle